Slapy is a municipality and village in Tábor District in the South Bohemian Region of the Czech Republic. It has about 500 inhabitants.

Administrative parts
The village of Hnojná Lhotka is an administrative part of Slapy.

References

Villages in Tábor District